Terra Nova is a 1991 film directed by Calogero Salvo and starring Marisa Laurito, Antonio Banderas and Mimí Lazo.

External links

English-language Italian films
1990s English-language films
1990s Italian films